Mrákotín is a market town in Jihlava District in the Vysočina Region of the Czech Republic. It has about 900 inhabitants.

Administrative parts
Villages of Dobrá Voda and Praskolesy are administrative parts of Mrákotín.

References

Populated places in Jihlava District
Market towns in the Czech Republic